Camillo Leonardi was a 16th-century Italian astronomer and astrologer from Pesaro.

He was a courtier of Costanzo I Sforza and then of his son Giovanni Sforza. He had a doctorate in medicine at the University of Padua.

Works

External links 
 

16th-century astrologers
16th-century Italian astronomers
16th-century Italian physicians
People from Pesaro